Megalochori (Greek: Μεγαλοχώρι) may refer to the following places in Greece:

Megalochori, a village on Agkistri, Saronic islands
Megalochori, Methana, a village in the Methana peninsula
Megalochori, Lesbos, a village in the municipal unit Plomari, Lesbos
Megalochori, Santorini, a village in the island of Santorini in the Cyclades
Megalochori, Serres, a village in the Serres regional unit
Megalochori, Trikala, a village in the Trikala regional unit